Perre's Ventaglio III is an outdoor 1967 stainless steel and enamel sculpture by Beverly Pepper, installed at Olympic Sculpture Park in Seattle, Washington.

See also

 1967 in art

References

1967 sculptures
Olympic Sculpture Park
Stainless steel sculptures in Washington (state)